The 1984 Reading Borough Council election was held on 3 May 1984, at the same time as other local elections across England and Scotland. One third of Reading Borough Council's 45 seats were up for election.

The election saw the Conservatives' majority on the council reduced to just one seat. After the election, the Conservatives had 23 seats, Labour had 17 seats, and the SDP-Liberal Alliance had 5 seats.

The leader of the Conservative group was Deryck Morton, and the leader of the Labour group was Mike Orton, both remaining in post after the election. The Liberal leader on the council prior to the election was Basil Dunning, but he was replaced immediately after the election by former leader Jim Day, who had lost his seat in 1983 but regained it at this election.

Results

Ward results
The results in each ward were as follows (candidates with an asterisk(*) were the previous incumbent standing for re-election, candidates with a dagger(†) were sitting councillors contesting different wards):

By-elections 19841986

Church by-election 1984

The Church ward by-election in 1984 was triggered by the resignation of Labour councillor Dave Absolom.

Battle by-election 1985

The Battle ward by-election in 1985 was triggered by the death of Labour councillor Joe Bristow.

References

1984 English local elections
1984